Laura A. Freele Osborn (1866-1955) was a suffragist, campaigner for school reform, and long-serving member of the School Board for Detroit Public Schools in Detroit, Michigan during the early half of the 20th century.

Early life and education
She was born and raised in Huntington, Indiana.

Career
Laura F. Osborn was a prominent advocate of non-partisan school boards in Michigan, including contribution to legislation passed in 1913 and later lobbying then Governor Woodbridge N. Ferris to support this reform.

She was first elected to the Detroit School Board in 1917, campaigning on a platform of reform. She was the first woman elected to citywide office in Detroit. She served on the school board for 38 years, until her death in 1955. During that time she was selected as board president seven times. Osborn also played a role in developing Wayne State University in the mid-1930s. 

She is also credited with having mobilized women into the cause of school reform and temperance, and also to have "broken the prejudice against women officeholders in Detroit". She also ran unsuccessfully for Detroit City Council two times.

Personal life
She taught school in Huntington until her marriage in 1891 to Francis C. Osborn, a Detroit businessman and inventor.

Legacy
 Osborn High School in Detroit, built in the late 1950s, was named in her honor.
 She was inducted into the Michigan Women's Hall of Fame in 1995.

References

 Osborn High School
 "The Folks Behind DPS Building Names: Laura Freele-Osborn," Transporting News (Office of Student Transportation, Detroit Public Schools) Vol. 2, No. 8, April 2007, page 3
 "10 Historic Detroiters You Should Know," Daily Detroit, 15 January 2015

American educational theorists
Schoolteachers from Indiana
American women educators
Politicians from Detroit
Wayne State University people
1866 births
1955 deaths
American suffragists
Women in Michigan politics
People from Huntington, Indiana
American temperance activists
Members of the Detroit Board of Education